Oswell is both a surname and a given name. Notable people with the name include:

Francis Oswell (1920–2003), Australian architect
Jason Oswell (born 1992), English footballer
William Cotton Oswell (1818–1893), English explorer
Oswell Blakeston, pseudonym of Henry Joseph Hasslacher (1907–1985), British writer and artist
Oswell Borradaile (1859–1935), English cricketer